Peder Kjær (born 23 February 1935) is a Danish footballer. He played in three matches for the Denmark national football team in 1957.

References

External links
 

1935 births
Living people
Danish men's footballers
Denmark international footballers
Place of birth missing (living people)
Association footballers not categorized by position